Lorraine TGV station (French: Gare de Lorraine TGV) is a railway station located in Louvigny, France, on the LGV Est, a high-speed rail line running from Paris to Strasbourg. Opened in 2007 as part of the first phase of the new line, it is situated near Metz–Nancy–Lorraine Airport, between the cities of Metz and Nancy. As the two other new LGV Est stations (Gare de Champagne-Ardenne TGV and Gare de Meuse TGV) it is served by TGV inOui and Ouigo services.

When built, it was criticised for being too far from any of the towns to be useful. There have been many political disputes since the 1990s to decide if it should be rebuilt at Vandières, Meurthe-et-Moselle, connected with the Metz–Nancy railway line (TER Grand Est). It was the subject of a local referendum in February 2015, in which the majority of votes (58%) were against moving the station to Vandières, but voter turnout was very low (10%). As a result, the project was abandoned.

Train services

References

External links

 

Railway stations in Moselle (department)
Railway stations in France opened in 2007